Charoblemma is a genus of moths of the family Noctuidae. The genus was erected by Harrison Gray Dyar Jr. in 1914.

Species
Charoblemma discipuncta Hampson, 1910
Charoblemma opisthomela Dyar, 1914 Panama
Charoblemma unilinea Dyar, 1914 Panama

References

Acontiinae